Phil Gehrig (25 January 1935 – 15 July 1993) was  a former Australian rules footballer who played with Footscray in the Victorian Football League (VFL). 	

Coached Ganmain Football Club in the South West Football League (New South Wales) from 1968 to 1970.

Notes

External links 		
		
		
		
		
		
		
		
1935 births		
1993 deaths		
Australian rules footballers from New South Wales
Western Bulldogs players